Manuel Haro Ruiz (17 April 1931 – 18 October 2013) was a Spanish professional footballer who played as a forward.

Career
Born in Seville, Haro played for Sevilla, Jaén, Mallorca, Levante, Valladolid and Cádiz.

Later life and death
Haro died on 19 October 2013.

References

1931 births
2013 deaths
Spanish footballers
Sevilla FC players
Real Jaén footballers
RCD Mallorca players
Levante UD footballers
Real Valladolid players
Cádiz CF players
Association football forwards
Spanish football managers
Real Jaén managers